International Hockey Stadium is hockey stadium located in Rajnandgaon, Chhattisgarh. The stadium is Chhattisgarh's first international astroturf hockey stadium and second largest hockey stadium after Raipur Stadium is spread over an area of nearly 9.5 acres, and built at an estimated cost of 22 crores was dedicated to public in January 2014 by state Governor Shekhar Dutt and chief minister Raman Singh.

The exhibition match between Governor's Eleven and CM's Eleven comprising some international players, including Indian hockey men's squad skipper Sardara Singh, Harjot Singh, Affan Yousuf, Lalit Upadhyay and others, also was played the occasion.

This was the second key international standard sports infrastructure envisioned by Raman Singh which was built by the State Government after the Raipur International Cricket Stadium came up at an estimated cost of `100 crore at Naya Raipur.

References

Field hockey venues in India
Sports venues in Rajnandgaon
2014 establishments in Chhattisgarh
Sports venues completed in 2014
Rajnandgaon